Marjorie Ann Hoy (19 May 1941 – 19 June 2020) was an American entomologist and geneticist known for her work using integrated pest management (IPM) and biological control in agriculture. She was Professor and Eminent Scholar at the University of Florida, Fellow of the Royal Entomological Society of London, the American Association for the Advancement of Science, and Entomological Society of America. She was known as a pioneer in using genetic engineering to reduce the impact of agricultural pests, including developing pesticide resistant predators to  control populations of destructive pests in areas where pesticides are applied. Her books include the textbook Insect Molecular Genetics, the third edition of which was published in 2013.

Hoy was born in Kansas City, Kansas, in 1941. She earned her BA at the University of Kansas in 1963, and completed her M.S. (1966) and PhD (1972) at the University of California, Berkeley. She was Research Entomologist at the Connecticut Agricultural Experiment Station (1973–1974) and U.S. Forest Service Northeast Forest Experiment Station (1974–1976) before joining the faculty at University of California, Berkeley, where she worked from 1976 to 1992. She joined the University of Florida in 1992. She died in Colorado on June 19, 2020, aged 79.

Books
 179 pp.
 185 pp.
 589 pp.
 540 pp. (2nd edition, 2003; 3rd edition, 2013)
 430 pp.

References

External links
Faculty profile, Entomology and Nematology Department, University of Florida

1941 births
2020 deaths
People from Kansas City, Kansas
University of Kansas alumni
University of California, Berkeley alumni
University of California, Berkeley College of Natural Resources faculty
University of Florida faculty
Fellows of the American Association for the Advancement of Science
Fellows of the Entomological Society of America
20th-century American women scientists
American geneticists
Fellows of the Royal Entomological Society
American arachnologists
20th-century American scientists
Women entomologists
American women academics
21st-century American women